Sang-e Siah or Sang-e Siyah may refer to:

Sang-e Siyah, Hormozgan
Sang-e Siah, Razavi Khorasan